Lethbridge is a city in the province of Alberta, Canada. With a population of 101,482 in its 2019 municipal census, Lethbridge became the fourth Alberta city to surpass 100,000 people. The nearby  Canadian Rocky Mountains contribute to the city's warm summers, mild winters, and windy climate. Lethbridge lies southeast of Calgary on the Oldman River.

Lethbridge is the commercial, financial, transportation and industrial centre of southern Alberta. The city's economy developed from drift mining for coal in the late 19th century and agriculture in the early 20th century. Half of the workforce is employed in the health, education, retail and hospitality sectors, and the top five employers are government-based. The only university in Alberta south of Calgary is in Lethbridge, and two of the three colleges in southern Alberta have campuses in the city. Cultural venues in the city include performing art theatres, museums and sports centres.

History 

Before the 19th century, the Lethbridge area was populated by several First Nations at various times. The Blackfoot referred to the area as Aksaysim ("steep banks"), Mek-kio-towaghs ("painted rock"), Assini-etomochi ("where we slaughtered the Cree") and Sik-ooh-kotok ("coal"). The Sarcee referred to it as Chadish-kashi ("black/rocks"), the Cree as Kuskusukisay-guni ("black/rocks"), and the Nakoda (Stoney) as Ipubin-saba-akabin ("digging coal"). The Kutenai people referred to it as ʔa•kwum.

After the US Army stopped alcohol trading with the Blackfeet Nation in Montana in 1869, traders John J. Healy and Alfred B. Hamilton started a whiskey trading post at Fort Hamilton, near the future site of Lethbridge. The post's nickname became Fort Whoop-Up. The whiskey trade led to the Cypress Hills Massacre of many native Assiniboine in 1873. The North-West Mounted Police, sent to stop the trade and establish order, arrived at Fort Whoop-Up on October 9, 1874. They managed the post for the next 12 years.

Lethbridge's economy developed from drift mines opened by Nicholas Sheran in 1874 and the North Western Coal and Navigation Company in 1882. North Western's president was William Lethbridge, from whom the city derives its name. By the turn of the century, the mines employed about 150 men and produced 300 tonnes of coal each day. In 1896, local collieries were the largest coal producers in the Northwest Territories, with production peaking during World War I. An internment camp was set up at the Exhibition Building in Lethbridge from September 1914 to November 1916. After the war, increasing oil and natural gas production gradually replaced coal production, and the last mine in Lethbridge closed in 1957.

The first rail line in Lethbridge was opened on August 28, 1885, by the Alberta Railway and Coal Company, which bought the North Western Coal and Navigation Company five years later. The rail industry's dependence on coal and the Canadian Pacific Railway's efforts to settle southern Alberta with immigrants boosted Lethbridge's economy. After the Canadian Pacific Railway (CPR) moved the divisional point of its Crowsnest Line from Fort Macleod to Lethbridge in 1905, the city became the regional centre for Southern Alberta. In the mid-1980s, the CPR moved its rail yards in downtown Lethbridge to nearby Kipp, and Lethbridge ceased being a rail hub.

Between 1907 and 1913, a development boom occurred in Lethbridge, making it the main marketing, distribution and service centre in southern Alberta. Such municipal projects as a water treatment plant, a power plant, a streetcar system, and exhibition buildings—as well as a construction boom and rising real estate prices—transformed the mining town into a significant city. Between World War I and World War II, however, the city experienced an economic slump. Development slowed, drought drove farmers from their farms, and coal mining rapidly declined from its peak. After World War II, irrigation of farmland near Lethbridge led to growth in the city's population and economy. Lethbridge College (previously Lethbridge Community College) opened in April 1957 and the University of Lethbridge in 1967.

Geography  

Lethbridge is Alberta's third-largest by population after Calgary and Edmonton.

Lethbridge is split into three geographical areas: north, south and west. The Oldman River separates West Lethbridge from the other two, while Crowsnest Trail and the Canadian Pacific Railway rail line separate North and South Lethbridge. The newest and largest of the three areas, West Lethbridge (pop. 40,898) is home to the University of Lethbridge—which opened at that site in 1971. Although several farms existed on the what is now the Westside, the first housing development was not completed until 1974 and Whoop-Up Drive access opened only in 1975. Much of the city's recent growth has been on the west side, and it has the youngest median age of the three. The north side (pop. 28,172) was originally populated by workers from local coal mines. It has the oldest population of the three areas, is home to multiple industrial parks and includes the former Hamlet of Hardieville, which was annexed by Lethbridge in 1978. South Lethbridge (pop.  32,412) is the commercial heart of the city; it contains the downtown core, the bulk of retail and hospitality establishments, and the Lethbridge College.

Climate 
With precipitation averaging , and 264 dry days on average, Lethbridge is the eleventh driest city in Canada. Mean relative humidity hovers between 69 and 78% in the morning throughout the year, but afternoon mean relative humidity is more uneven, ranging from 38% in August to 58% in January.

These factors protect the city from strong northwest and southwest winds and contribute to frequent chinook winds during the winter. Lethbridge winters have the highest temperatures in the prairies, reducing the severity and duration of winter cold periods and resulting in fewer days with snow cover. The average daytime temperature peaks by the end of July/beginning of August, when it reaches .

Demographics 

With the 2019 municipal census results, the City of Lethbridge became the fourth city in Alberta to surpass 100,000 people.

The same census reported that the metropolitan area of Lethbridge was 117,394 in 2016, up from 105,999 in 2011. Subsequent data from Statistics Canada showed that the 2020 metropolitan population was  128,851, an increase of 1.5% over the previous year.

In 2021, 49.8% of residents were Christian, down from 64.6% in 2011. 16.1% of the population were Catholic, 12.9% were Protestant, and 11.3% were Christians of unspecified denomination. All other Christian denominations and Christian-related traditions made up 9.6%, including a large population of Latter Day Saints adherents(5.8%). 44.3% of the population was nonreligious or secular, up from 32.4% in 2011. 8.1% followed a religion (or spiritual belief) other than Christianity. The largest non-Christian religions were Islam (1.9%), Hinduism (1.3%), and Buddhism (1.1%).

According to the 2021 census,  83.9% of residents spoke English as a first language. Other common mother tongues were Spanish (1.6%),Tagalog (1.4%), Nepali (1.0%), German (0.9%), French (0.8%), Chinese Languages (0.7%), Arabic (0.7%) and Dutch (0.6%). 1.7% of residents claimed both English and a non-official language as their first language.

Lethbridge was 12.9% visible minorities and 7.1% aboriginal in 2016. Below is a full break down of the demographics.  The city is also the home of the largest Bhutanese community in Canada.

Economy 

Lethbridge is southern Alberta's commercial, distribution, financial and industrial centre (although Medicine Hat plays a similar role in southeastern Alberta).

Lethbridge's economy has traditionally been agriculture-based; however, it has diversified in recent years. Half of the workforce is employed in the health, education, retail and hospitality sectors, and the top five employers are government-based. Several national companies are based in Lethbridge. From its founding in 1935, Canadian Freightways based its head office there until moving operations to Calgary in 1948, though its call centre remains in Lethbridge. Taco Time Canada was based in the city from 1978 to 1995 before moving to Calgary. Minute Muffler, which began in 1969, is based in Lethbridge. International shipping company H & R Transport has been based in the city since 1955. Braman Furniture, which has locations in Manitoba and Ontario, was headquartered in Lethbridge from 1991 to 2008.

Lethbridge serves as a hub for commercial activity in the region by providing services and amenities. Many transport services, including Red Arrow buses, four provincial highways, rail service and an airport, are concentrated in or near the city. In 2004, the police services of Lethbridge and Coaldale combined to form the Lethbridge Police Service. Lethbridge provides municipal water to Coaldale, Coalhurst, Diamond City, Iron Springs, Monarch, Shaughnessy and Turin.

In 2002, the municipal government organized Economic Development Lethbridge, a body responsible for promoting and developing the city's commercial interests. Two years later, the city joined in a partnership with 24 other local communities to create an economic development alliance called SouthGrow, representing a population of over 140,000. In 2006, Economic Development Lethbridge partnered with SouthGrow Regional Initiative and Alberta SouthWest Regional Alliance to create the Southern Alberta Alternative Energy Partnership. This partnership promotes business related to alternative energy, including wind power, solar power and biofuel, in the region.

Arts and culture 

Lethbridge was designated a Cultural Capital of Canada for the 2004–2005 season. The Southern Alberta Ethnic Association (Multicultural Heritage Centre) promotes multiculturalism and ethnic heritage in the community.

The city is home to venues and organizations promoting the arts. Founded in 1958, the Allied Arts Council of Lethbridge is the largest organization in the city dedicated to preserving and enhancing the local arts. In the spring of 2007, the Allied Arts Council Facilities Steering Committee initiated the Arts Re:Building Together Campaign, a grass roots campaign initiative to raise awareness and support for improving arts facilities in Lethbridge. The campaign identified three arts buildings: the Yates Memorial Centre, the Bowman Arts Centre, and the Southern Alberta Art Gallery as cornerstone facilities in the community requiring care and attention. On July 14, 2007, the Finance Committee of City Council approved four arts capital projects for inclusion in the city's Ten Year Capital Plan. Under the campaign to 2010, the renovation and expansion of the Southern Alberta Art Gallery was completed, a new Community Arts Centre will be built in downtown Lethbridge, the City of Lethbridge has a Public Art Program, and a committee was formed to research the possibility of a new Performing Arts Centre in Lethbridge.

Lethbridge has a public library and three major museum/galleries. The Southern Alberta Art Gallery is a contemporary gallery; the community arts centre Casa, administered by the Allied Arts Council; and the University of Lethbridge Art Gallery produces contemporary exhibitions including works from its extensive collection of Canadian, American and European art.

The city is also home to the Lethbridge Symphony, which was founded in 1960 and incorporated as a non-profit in 1961. It has produced several spin-off music groups, including the Southern Alberta Chamber Orchestra, and the still-active Lethbridge Musical Theatre, which produces an annual show. Vox Musica, which traces its roots back to 1968, is a community choir previously based at the University of Lethbridge. As a fully independent non-profit society, Vox Musica continues to rehearse and perform at Southminster United Church and around the community. Theatrical productions are presented by the University of Lethbridge's drama department and New West Theatre, which performs at the Genevieve E. Yates Memorial Centre using its two theatres: the 500-seat proscenium Yates Theatre and the 180-seat black box Sterndale Bennett Theatre.

Attractions 

The city, which began as a frontier town, has several historical attractions. The Lethbridge Viaduct, commonly known as the High Level Bridge, is the longest and highest steel trestle bridge in North America. It was completed in 1909 on what was then the city's western edge. Indian Battle Park, in the coulees of the Oldman River, commemorates the last battle between the Cree and the Blackfoot First Nations in 1870.

Originally known as Fort Hamilton, Fort Whoop-Up was a centre of illegal activities during the late 19th century. It was first built in 1869 by J.J. Healy and A.B. Hamilton as a whiskey post and was destroyed by fire a year later. A second, sturdier structure later replaced the fort.

As the cultural centre of southern Alberta, Lethbridge has notable cultural attractions. Nikka Yuko Japanese Garden in south Lethbridge was opened in 1967 as part of a Canadian centennial celebration attended by Japan's Prince and Princess Takamatsu. The Galt Museum & Archives is the largest museum in the Lethbridge area; the building housing the museum served as the city's main hospital during the late 19th century and early 20th centuries. Several other important attractions are based in Lethbridge, including the Lethbridge Military Museum and the Helen Schuler Nature Centre which educates about the river bottom and coulees.

Several structures such as the historic post office are prominent on the skyline of Lethbridge. Less well-known than the High Level Bridge, the post office is one of the most distinctive buildings in Lethbridge. Built in 1912, the four-storey structure is crowned by a functioning clock tower. Other prominent buildings include office towers; the water tower, which was originally built in 1958 and sold to a private developer who converted it into a restaurant; and the Alberta Terminals grain elevators.

From March 2018 to August 2020, Lethbridge was home to ARCHES, 24-hour supervised drug use site. It was the busiest SCS in North America with 663 visits a day. The Star called it a "new landmark". The SCS featured injection drug and inhalation drug facilities and it was a subject of disagreement by the nearby business community. The site closed at the end of August 2020 after the province removed grant funding following discovery of misappropriation of public funds.

Sports and recreation 

Lethbridge has designated 16 percent of the land within city boundaries as parkland, including the  Oldman River valley parks system. It has facilities for field sports, numerous baseball diamonds, the Spitz Stadium, the Nicholas Sheran Park (a disc golf course), two skateparks, a BMX track, a climbing wall, a dozen tennis courts, and seven pools. It is home to five golf courses, including the award-winning Paradise Canyon Golf Resort, and is within  of several others.

Built for the 1975 Canada Games, the ENMAX Centre is Lethbridge's multipurpose arena. The 6,500-seat facility has hosted concerts, three-ring circuses, multicultural events, national curling championships, basketball events, banquets, skating events and is home to the Lethbridge Hurricanes, a major Western Hockey League franchise. The arena has a running track, racquetball and squash courts, and a full-size ice rink. In 1997, the  Servus Sports Centre (originally the Lethbridge Soccer Centre) was built directly south of the ENMAX Centre and added two regulation size indoor soccer pitches to the complex. The Lethbridge Kyodokan Judo Club facility is located next to the Community Savings Place, and has been a Judo Canada Regional Training Centre since 2015.

On the city's west side, Phase 1 of the ATB Centre, a recreation complex, opened in 2016 and houses two hockey rinks and the Lethbridge Curling Club. Phase 2 of this project The Cor Van Ray YMCA opened in May 2019  and includes a field house with basketball courts and a 300m running track, as well as an aquatics centre with slides and a wave pool.

Several winter sports venues are in or near Lethbridge. The city has six indoor ice arenas with a total ice area of 11,220 square metres (120,800 sq ft) and a total seating capacity of 8,149. Other than the ENMAX Centre, all ice surfaces are available from October to April only.

In October 2020, the Canadian Junior Football League (CJFL) announced an expansion team would begin play in Lethbridge at the 3,500-seat University of Lethbridge Stadium in 2022. The Lethbridge Vipers will be the seventh team in the Prairie Junior Football Conference and the 19th team in the CJFL.

Government 

Eight councillors and a mayor make up the Lethbridge City Council. City voters elect a new government every four years. The last election was October 18, 2021. Lethbridge does not have a ward system, so the mayor and all councillors are elected at large. The 2009–2011 operating budget of the City of Lethbridge was –278 million, more than half of which came from property tax. One Member of Parliament (MP) representing Lethbridge sits in the House of Commons in Ottawa, and two members of Alberta's legislative assembly (MLAs), representing Lethbridge-East (UCP) and Lethbridge-West (NDP), sit in the legislative assembly in Edmonton.

Traditionally, political leanings in Lethbridge have been right-wing. Federally, from 1917 to 1930, Lethbridge voters switched between various federal parties, but from 1935 to 1957, they voted Social Credit in each election. Progressive Conservatives held office from 1958 until 1993, when the Reform Party of Canada was formed. The Reform party and its various subsequent incarnations such as the current Conservative Party of Canada have dominated the polls since. The city's two provincial electoral districts are represented by one government MLA, currently Nathan Neudorf for Lethbridge-East, and one opposition MLA, currently Shannon Phillips for Lethbridge-West.

Alberta Health Services, the provincial health authority that plans and delivers health services on behalf of the  Ministry of Health,   administers public health services in Lethbridge. Chinook Health oversees facilities in southwestern Alberta, such as the Chinook Regional Hospital and St. Michael's Health Centre.

Transportation 

Mass transit in Lethbridge consists of 40 buses (with an average age of 10 years) operating on more than a dozen routes. Traditionally, bus routes in the city started and ended downtown. In the early 21st century, however, Lethbridge Transit introduced cross-town and shuttle routes, such as University of Lethbridge to Lethbridge College, University of Lethbridge to the North Lethbridge terminal, and Lethbridge College to the North Lethbridge terminal. Several routes converge near the Chinook Regional Hospital, although it is not officially a terminal.

The Parks and Recreation department maintains the citywide,  pedestrian/cyclist Coal Banks Trail system (map). The system was designed to connect the Oldman River valley with other areas of the city, including Pavan Park in the north, Henderson Lake in the east, Highways 4 and 5 in the south and a loop in West Lethbridge (including University Drive and McMaster Blvd).

Four provincial highways (3, 4, 5, and 25) run through or terminate in Lethbridge. This has led to the creation of major arterial roads, including Mayor Magrath Drive, University Drive and Scenic Drive. This infrastructure and its location on the CANAMEX Corridor has helped make Lethbridge and its freight depots a major shipping destination. Highways 2, 3 and 4 form part of the CANAMEX trade route between Mexico, the United States, and Canada.

Lethbridge has a commercial airport, the Lethbridge Airport, and the CPR rail yards in Kipp, Alberta (12 km away). The airport provides commercial flights to Calgary, industrial and corporate opportunities, as well as private and charter flights elsewhere. The airport provides customs services for flights arriving from the United States. The rail yards were moved to Kipp, just west of the city, from downtown Lethbridge in 1983. The yards were planned for redevelopment with a mix of multi-family residential, commercial and light industrial land uses. The Park Place Mall is now located on the portion of the former rail yards north of 1 Avenue South between Scenic Drive to the west and Stafford Drive to the east.

Education 

The Lethbridge School Division and the separate Holy Spirit Roman Catholic School Division administer grades kindergarten through 12 locally. The Palliser School Division, which is based in Lethbridge, administers public primary and secondary education in the outlying areas. Lethbridge School Division administers five high schools (Chinook High School, Immanuel Christian High School, Lethbridge Collegiate Institute, Victoria Park High School, and Winston Churchill High School), four middle schools, and 14 elementary schools in Lethbridge. Immanuel Christian covers grades 6 through 12.

Lethbridge is home to Lethbridge College, founded in 1957, and the University of Lethbridge, founded in 1967. Red Crow Community College has a campus in the city. During the 2015–2016 school year, the University of Lethbridge and the Lethbridge College had a combined enrolment of 14,820, which represented 20 percent of the city's population.

Media 

Lethbridge has two major newspapers: the daily Lethbridge Herald and the weekly Lethbridge Sun Times. The university and college each have a student-run, weekly newspaper. There are 11 FM radio stations, including CKXU-FM, a campus radio station located at the University of Lethbridge.

Notable people

See also 

List of communities in Alberta
List of cities in Alberta
List of people from Lethbridge

References

Further reading

External links 

 
1890 establishments in the Northwest Territories
Cities in Alberta
Hudson's Bay Company trading posts
Populated places established in 1890